The Britannia Trophy is a British award presented by the Royal Aero Club for aviators accomplishing the most meritorious performance in aviation during the previous year.

In 1911 Horatio Barber, who was a founder member of the Royal Aero Club, was given £100 for a commercial flight. Not wanting to tarnish his amateur status, he presented the money to the club for the trophy.

The first award was presented in 1913 to Captain C.A.H Longcroft of the Royal Flying Corps for a non-stop flight from Montrose to Farnborough in a Royal Aircraft Factory B.E.2a. The trophy has not been awarded every year, particularly during the first and second world wars, and has been awarded jointly and to teams, as well as individuals.

In 1952 the Royal Aero Club presented plaques to all the surviving holders who previously only held the trophy for one year and were not given a permanent memento.

Recipients

See also

 List of aviation awards

References

External links
 Royal Aero Club Awards and Trophies - The Britannia Trophy
 Royal Aero Club Awards and Trophies - The Britannia Trophy

Aviation awards
Awards established in 1913

1913 establishments in the United Kingdom
British awards
Aviation in the United Kingdom